Chromatomyia is a genus of flies belonging to the family Agromyzidae.

The genus has a cosmopolitan distribution.

Species
Species:

Chromatomyia actinidiae 
Chromatomyia aizoon 
Chromatomyia alopecuri 
Chromatomyia alpigenaeChromatomyia aprilina
Chromatomyia aragonensisChromatomyia asteris
Chromatomyia beigeraeChromatomyia blackstoniae
Chromatomyia centauriiChromatomyia ciliata
Chromatomyia dorsataChromatomyia farfarella
Chromatomyia furcataChromatomyia fuscula
Chromatomyia gentianaeChromatomyia gentianella
Chromatomyia gentiiChromatomyia glacialis
Chromatomyia griffithsianaChromatomyia hoppiella
Chromatomyia horticolaChromatomyia isicae
Chromatomyia lindbergiChromatomyia linnaeae
Chromatomyia loniceraeChromatomyia luzulae
Chromatomyia miliiChromatomyia nervi
Chromatomyia nigraChromatomyia norwegica
Chromatomyia obscuricepsChromatomyia ochracea
Chromatomyia opacellaChromatomyia paraciliata
Chromatomyia periclymeniChromatomyia primulae
Chromatomyia pseudogentiiChromatomyia pseudomilii
Chromatomyia ramosaChromatomyia rhaetica
Chromatomyia saxifragaeChromatomyia scabiosae
Chromatomyia scabiosarumChromatomyia scabiosella
Chromatomyia scolopendriChromatomyia skuratowiczi
Chromatomyia soldanellaeChromatomyia spenceriana
Chromatomyia styriacaChromatomyia succisae
Chromatomyia swertiaeChromatomyia syngenesiae
Chromatomyia tschirnhausiChromatomyia vernalis

References

Agromyzidae